Canberra Cosmos Football Club, an association football club based in Canberra, was founded in 1995. They were admitted into the National Soccer League for the 1995–96 season until the club folded in 2001.

Toplica Popovich held the record for the greatest number of appearances for Canberra Cosmos. The Australian defender played 123 times for the club. The club's goalscoring record was held by Peter Buljan who scored 21 goals.

Key
 The list is ordered first by date of debut, and then if necessary in alphabetical order.
 Appearances as a substitute are included.

Players

References
General
 
 

Specific

Canberra Cosmos FC players
Canberra Cosmos
Association football player non-biographical articles